Airline Highway is a divided highway in the U.S. state of Louisiana, built in stages between 1925 and 1953 to bypass the older Jefferson Highway.  It runs , carrying U.S. Highway 61 from New Orleans northwest to Baton Rouge and U.S. Highway 190 from Baton Rouge west over the Mississippi River on the Huey P. Long Bridge.  US 190 continues west towards Opelousas on an extension built at roughly the same time.

The highway was named "Airline" because it runs relatively straight on a new alignment, rather than alongside the winding Mississippi River. (Compare with the similar term air-line railroad.)  The name later became even more fitting, as both Louis Armstrong New Orleans International Airport and Baton Rouge Metropolitan Airport were built along the highway.  Airline Highway also runs close to the site of the old Baton Rouge airfield (near the intersection of Airline and Florida Boulevard, now a park and government office complex), which brings it within blocks of the similarly named Airport Avenue and Airway Drive.

History
The highway's origin is famously identified with Governor Huey P. Long, who advocated for a modern highway system in Louisiana.  Though the project was underway when Long took office, most of its initial construction was completed during his administration.  The Airline Highway was considered a pet project of Long's as it reduced the length of his journey between the capitol building in Baton Rouge and the bars and establishments in New Orleans, namely The Sazerac Bar in the Roosevelt Hotel. Originally, Airline Highway was a two-lane road that ran from Prairieville to Shrewsbury.  The first section, running between Williams Boulevard in Kenner and Shrewsbury Road, opened in June 1927.  It was begun by the Jefferson Parish Police Jury as a local road and incorporated into the plan for Airline Highway during construction.  The remainder of the highway was built between 1928 and 1933 by the Louisiana Highway Commission with federal aid, as the road would carry US 61 upon completion.

The section north of the spillway was officially opened on July 4, 1933, and the section on the south side followed three weeks later.  (Various sections had been temporarily opened to traffic beginning in October 1931.)  Completion of the bridge over the Bonnet Carré Spillway was delayed until 1935, necessitating a detour over the Jefferson Highway (River Road) via temporary gravel roads along the spillway guide levees.  The spillway bridge was opened to traffic on September 28, 1935 and dedicated on December 13.

At this time, traffic was routed from Prairieville into Baton Rouge over the Jefferson Highway (today's LA 73).  On the New Orleans end, travelers had the option to continue on Airline Highway and follow Metairie Road (the original route of Jefferson Highway) into town or transfer to the Jefferson Highway (today's LA 48) at Kenner and follow the direct connection onto South Claiborne Avenue completed in 1928.

The first improvements to the Airline Highway began in 1935 and consisted of widening and re-surfacing the Kenner-Shrewsbury link built a decade earlier.  The new four-lane section from Williams Boulevard to Haring Road opened in October 1937.  The new four- and six-lane section from Haring Road to Labarre Road opened in December 1938.  The latter project included a slight re-alignment and extension on the Shrewsbury end.  (Present-day Robertson Street is a remnant of the old alignment.)  The eight-lane extension into Tulane Avenue (reached by a now-demolished six-lane bridge over the former New Basin Canal) was officially opened on August 26, 1940.

Also in 1940, the Old Mississippi River Bridge opened in Baton Rouge.  With this occurrence, a 7.9 mile bypass was built around the city that went to the Nesser Overpass, opening to traffic in July 1941—this bypass was part of Airline Highway, but it was not connected to the rest of the highway until 1953.  A further extension continued west to the Atchafalaya Bridge at Krotz Springs.  The remainder of the highway was multilaned in sections during the 1940s and the 1950s.  For a short time in that decade, it was the longest toll-free four-lane highway in the nation, as the multilaned portion ran 124 miles from the Atchafalaya River to New Orleans.  The spillway bridge carried four very narrow lanes of traffic (often resulting in accidents) until 1984 when a parallel bridge was constructed.

The majority of the New Orleans-Baton Rouge section was built parallel to the Louisiana Railway and Navigation Company, which was itself built later than the slightly longer Yazoo and Mississippi Valley Railroad. The former Louisiana Railway, now part of the Kansas City Southern Railway, crosses the Huey Long Bridge with the highway and splits to the northwest towards Shreveport; the extension to Opelousas parallels the New Orleans, Texas and Mexico Railway (later part of the Missouri Pacific Railroad).

Originally US Highways 65 and 51 were cosigned to Airline (65 the entire length, and 51 from LaPlace to New Orleans).  In 1951, Louisiana truncated the route lengths, and the highway, with the exception of a portion in north Baton Rouge, is signed as US 61.

In an effort to clean up the highway's notorious history due to the seedy hotels and motels that once lined it, the portion in Jefferson Parish has been renamed Airline Drive.

Baton Rouge bypass

The portion of the Airline Highway north and east of downtown Baton Rouge carries U.S. Highway 61 and U.S. Highway 190 around downtown, and includes several interchanges. The bypass was designated U.S. Highway 61/190 Bypass from 1957 to 1963, after which US 61 and US 190 were moved onto it, and their old routes through downtown became US 61 Business/US 190 Business. The bypass and business routes originally intersected in a traffic circle, which was replaced in 1963 by a cloverleaf interchange.

In the original 1955 plan for urban Interstate Highways, numbered by 1959, the Baton Rouge bypass was designated Interstate 410; it would have connected to Interstate 10 on both ends (as I-10 would have used the US 190 corridor immediately west of Baton Rouge, still crossing the Atchafalaya Swamp in its present location). The route was cancelled by the end of the 1960s, and the number was later reused for another I-410 (which itself was cancelled in 1977).

Major intersections

References

External links

 LA DOTD website

Roads in Louisiana
Transportation in Ascension Parish, Louisiana
Transportation in Baton Rouge, Louisiana
Transportation in East Baton Rouge Parish, Louisiana
Transportation in Jefferson Parish, Louisiana
Transportation in New Orleans
Transportation in Pointe Coupee Parish, Louisiana
Transportation in St. Charles Parish, Louisiana
Transportation in St. James Parish, Louisiana
Transportation in St. John the Baptist Parish, Louisiana
Transportation in the New Orleans metropolitan area
Transportation in West Baton Rouge Parish, Louisiana
U.S. Route 51
U.S. Route 61
U.S. Route 65